Welcome to the Cruel World is Ben Harper's debut album from Virgin Records. Released in 1994, the album established Harper as a popular folk musician in the California area.  After this release, Harper went on to add a permanent backing band, the Innocent Criminals, although they remained unnamed until the Burn to Shine album. The song "I'll Rise" is based on a 1978 Maya Angelou poem "And Still I Rise".

Track listing
All songs written by Ben Harper except as noted.
"The Three of Us" – 2:35
"Whipping Boy" (Chris Darrow) – 5:31
"Breakin' Down" (Harper, music: Jean-Pierre Plunier) – 4:00
"Don't Take That Attitude to Your Grave" – 4:25
"Waiting on an Angel" – 3:53
"Mama's Got a Girlfriend Now" – 2:29
"Forever" – 3:23
"Like a King" – 4:18
"Pleasure and Pain" – 3:44
"Walk Away" – 3:49
"How Many Miles Must We March" – 3:07
"Welcome to the Cruel World" – 5:36
"I'll Rise" (lyrics: Maya Angelou; music: Harper) – 3:35
 Contains the hidden track "...By and By I'm Going to See the King" (Blind Willie Johnson) – 0:30
 "Remember - unreleased version (bonus track) - 2:49

Personnel
Music credits
Ben Harper - vocals, acoustic guitar, Weissenborn guitar, dobro
Richard Cook - Uillean pipes on "Pleasure and Pain"
Rock Deadrick - percussion, drums, backing vocals
Tom Freund
Suzie Katayama - cello on "Pleasure and Pain"
John McKnight - bass, accordion on "Mama's Got a Girlfriend Now"
Tommy D. Daugherty - drum programming
Gail Deadrick - piano on "I'll Rise"
Clabe Hangan, Clarence Butler, John Taylor, Kenneth McDaniel, Clyde Allen, Jelanie Jones, Kevin Williams - backing vocals
Production credits
Producers: Ben Harper, J.P. Plunier
Associate producer: Jeff Gottlieb, Mikal Reid
Engineer: Mikal Reid
Assistant engineer: Bradley Cook
Mixing: Mikal Reid
Mastering: Eddy Schreyer
Advisor: Ben Elder
Art direction: Tom Dolan, J.P. Plunier
Research: Ben Elder
Photography: Jeff Gottlieb

Charts

Certifications

}
}

References

Ben Harper albums
1994 debut albums
Virgin Records albums